Tiñana is a parish in Siero, a municipality within the province and autonomous community of Asturias, in northern Spain.

Santa Maria Tiñana is an eighteenth-century church dedicated to Our Lady of the Visitation.

References

Parishes in Siero